Cilo Dağı is the third highest mountain in Turkey.

Description
The Uludoruk, located in the immediate vicinity ( away), is the second highest mountain in Turkey. In 1984, the area was closed to civilians. It was not until 2002 that a team of mountaineers was authorized to climb again the Cilo mountains.

See also
 Ark of Nuh or Noah
 List of mountains in Turkey
 Mount Judi

References

External links
 Sketch of the range

Geography of Hakkâri Province
Important Bird Areas of Turkey
Mountains of the Armenian Highlands
Cilo
Taurus Mountains
Zagros Mountains